Rainbow Glacier is located on the northeast slopes of Mount Baker in the North Cascades of the U.S. state of Washington. In the middle of its course, Rainbow Glacier is connected to Park Glacier to its south and Mazama Glacier to the west. Between 1850 and 1950, Rainbow Glacier retreated . During a cooler and wetter period from 1950 to 1979, the glacier advanced  but between 1980 and 2006 retreated back .

See also 
List of glaciers in the United States

References 

Glaciers of Mount Baker
Glaciers of Washington (state)